The Queensland State Emergency Service (QSES) in Queensland, Australia is a volunteer based organisation of the Queensland Government and forms part of the Queensland Fire and Emergency Services (QFES), responsible for disaster management and as an emergency services auxiliary.

The current head of the Queensland State Emergency Service is Assistant Commissioner Andrew Short.

In 2011, the Queensland State Emergency Service was a recipient of the Queensland Greats Awards.

History
In 1975, the State Government established the Queensland State Emergency Service (QSES). This Service evolved from the former Queensland Civil Defence Organisation that had been in operation since 1961.

From its beginning in 1961 until November 1973, the Queensland Civil Defence Organisation was set up to deal with emergencies in the event of a nuclear war. It took no part in natural disaster operations other than operations following Cyclone ALTHEA in December 1971.

In November 1973, a tornado caused considerable damage in the Brisbane area and the Civil Defence Organisation was activated to assist in disaster relief. The Civil Defence Organisation saw a much larger involvement in natural disasters during the 1974 Brisbane floods.

The Queensland State Emergency Service was established in 1975, which evolved from the Queensland Civil Defence Organisation which commenced in 1961.

The Queensland State Emergency Service was established because there was a need for a service that was capable of dealing with natural disasters as well as undertaking a civil defence role in the event of armed aggression against the Australian mainland.

In 1975, the State Government introduced the State Counter Disaster Organisation Act, which was proclaimed on 11 December 1975. The Act established two organisations, the State Counter Disaster Organisation (SCDO) and the Queensland State Emergency Service (QSES).

During 2002-03 the Department of Emergency Services undertook a comprehensive review of the State Counter Disaster Organisation Act 1975 in consultation with a wide range of stakeholders. The review resulted in the development of the Disaster Management Act 2003.  The Disaster Management Act 2003 repealed and replaced the State Counter-Disaster Organisation Act when it commenced by proclamation on 31 March 2004.  Following legislation updates on 21 May 2014 the SES is now established under the Queensland Fire and Emergency Services Act 1990.

The Act maintains many elements of the existing system established under the State Counter Disaster Organisation Act, while adding contemporary elements such as a focus on comprehensive disaster management, which includes disaster mitigation, prevention, preparedness, response and recovery.

QSES Units are established at local government level, to provide emergency support functions to local communities.  These QSES Units have separate SES Groups established, depending on population and geographical needs. At present, there are 337 QSES Groups in Queensland. QSES Units and Groups are volunteer based.  The QSES is designed to empower people to help themselves and others in their community in times of emergency and disaster. The basic concept is one of self-help and mutual assistance within each community.

Role
The QSES is part of the Queensland Fire and Emergency Services. QFES is the primary provider of fire, rescue and emergency services within Queensland.

The QSES's main roles are preparing for, and responding to different type of emergencies and disasters from a local level to a national disaster much like the 2010–2011 Queensland floods and Cyclone Yasi.

The QSES are trained and equipped to deal with emergencies like;
Cyclones and Storms
Floods
Urban Search and Rescue
Emergency Traffic Management
Vertical Rescue 
Road Crash Rescue
Searches for missing persons/land searches
Incident Management
Community Education
Agency Support

Leadership
The following list chronologically records those who have held the post of Assistant Commissioner of the Queensland State Emergency Service.

Ranks

*Prior to the establishment of the Queensland Fire & Emergency Service in 2013, the State Emergency Service used to have the ranks of Deputy Chief Officer and Chief Officer.

Honours and awards

Medals
National medals
Honours worn in the order shown.

State medals
Queensland State Emergency Service medals and ribbons are worn in accordance with the strict Order of Precedence below, from centre to right.  The award with the highest precedence is worn closest to the centre of the chest and on the top row of ribbon bars when more than four awards are worn. QSES members are only eligible for one medal, not both.

Citations
Citations are worn centrally, 5mm above the nameplate on the right breast pocket of service shirts, tunics and coats. The Order of Precedence for Queensland State Emergency Service citations is as follows:

See also

State Emergency Service

References

External links

SES Official site

1975 establishments in Australia
Emergency services in Queensland
Q150 Icons
Queensland Greats